Mariano Adriàn Bogliacino (born 2 June 1980) is a Uruguayan football midfielder who currently plays for Deportivo Maldonado. He is of Italian descent.

Career
Bogliacino begun his career as a football player in his hometown team, Plaza Colonia. He showed great technical potential in the Uruguayan Premiership, playing as offensive midfielder, left wing ad half-back. After a short Spanish experience at Las Palmas (La Liga 2), Bogliacino moved to Italy, where he played for Sambenedettese in Serie C1 (the third level of Italian football) for two years.

He was a skilled half-back and scored twice against Napoli, which had just been relegated to the third category because of the team's failure. Napoli's manager, the wise and careful Pierpaolo Marino, immediately noticed the player. In the summer of 2005, Bogliacino was bought by Napoli. That year, Napoli won Serie C1 and Bogliacino became a more important player on the team. The trainer Edy Reja used Bogliacino both as left wing and as central midfielder. In June 2007, he signed a new 5-year contract with club.

Personal life
He is married and has a daughter, Celeste, born in Naples. She is named after the national and club team's colour (in Spanish and Italian celeste means light blue).

References

External links
Player profile on Napoli's official website

1980 births
Living people
Association football midfielders
Uruguayan Primera División players
La Liga players
Serie A players
Serie B players
Serie C players
Segunda División players
Uruguayan Segunda División players
S.S.C. Napoli players
A.S. Sambenedettese players
A.C. ChievoVerona players
UD Las Palmas players
S.S.C. Bari players
U.S. Lecce players
Club Plaza Colonia de Deportes players
Peñarol players
Deportivo Maldonado players
Uruguayan expatriate footballers
Uruguayan footballers
Expatriate footballers in Spain
Uruguayan expatriate sportspeople in Italy
Uruguayan people of Italian descent